The men's lightweight event was part of the boxing programme at the 1920 Summer Olympics.  The weight class was the fourth-lightest contested, and allowed boxers of up to 135.5 pounds (61.2 kilograms). The competition was held from August 21, 1920 to August 24, 1920. 16 boxers from ten nations competed.

Results

References

Sources
 
 

Lightweight